Kingdom of the Sun may refer to:

Inca Empire
Ancient Egypt
Kingdom of the Sun, working title of the 2000 film The Emperor's New Groove

See also
Empire of the Sun (disambiguation)
King of the Sun, an album by The Saints
Kings of the Sun, a 1963 film
Kings of the Sun (band), an Australian hard rock band